Mats Wilander was the defending champion, but lost to Claudio Pistolesi in the third round.

Ivan Lendl won the title, defeating Martín Jaite 5–7, 6–4, 7–5, 6–3 in the final.

Seeds
All sixteen seeds received a bye to the second round.

  Ivan Lendl (champion)
  Mats Wilander (third round)
  Boris Becker (second round)
  Yannick Noah (semifinals)
  Andrés Gómez (quarterfinals)
  Kent Carlsson (third round)
  Martín Jaite (final)
  Emilio Sánchez (second round)
  Andrei Chesnokov (third round)
  Joakim Nyström (quarterfinals)
  Henri Leconte (quarterfinals)
  Jonas Svensson (second round)
  Slobodan Živojinović (second round)
  Guillermo Pérez Roldán (second round)
  Aaron Krickstein (second round)
  Claudio Mezzadri (second round)

Draw

Finals

Top half

Section 1

Section 2

Bottom half

Section 3

Section 4

External links
 Main draw

1988 Monte Carlo Open